Edoardo Vianello (born 24 June 1938) is an Italian singer, composer and actor. He's considered one of the most popular Italian singers of the Sixties.

Career
Born in Rome, Vianello started his career in 1956.  His first successes came in 1961, with "Il capello" ("The Hair") and "Pinne fucile ed occhiali" ("Fins, rifle, and glasses"), which both charted up to the 2nd position in the Italian Hit Parade. 

Vianello had several successes in the 1960s, such as "Guarda come dondolo" ("Watch How I swing"), "Abbronzatissima" ("Very Tanned"), "O mio signore" ("Oh my Lord") which topped the charts, and "I Watussi" which went up to 3rd. After a less successful period, he re-launched his career in the 1970s, founding the duo Vianella with his wife Wilma Goich. Their main hit of the period was "Semo gente de borgata" ("We're people from a small town") that reached #7. In the late 1970s, he reprised his solo career.

As of 2006, songs of Vianello were included in the soundtracks of 64 films while the Italian rights-collecting agency SIAE estimates sales of over 50 million Vianello records worldwide.

References

Further reading 
 Enzo Giannelli. Edoardo Vianello. Il Re Mida dell'estate. Armando Curcio Editore, 2009. .

External links 
 Official site
 
 Edoardo Vianello at Discogs

Living people
Italian male actors
1938 births
Italian singer-songwriters
Male actors from Rome
Italian pop singers
People of Venetian descent